Nobody Else is the third studio album by British boy band Take That. It would become Take That's last studio album to be recorded before they disbanded in 1996.

The album includes the singles "Sure", "Back for Good" (which remains the group's most successful song to date) and "Never Forget".

The album sold six million copies worldwide.

Background
Nobody Else was released on 8 May 1995 in the UK, Europe and Asia and on 15 August 1995 in North America. This album saw lead singer and songwriter Gary Barlow take an extensive role in the overall production, co-producing all but two tracks with Chris Porter and Brothers in Rhythm. During the recording of the album, Barlow disagreed with manager Nigel Martin-Smith over the band's musical direction—Barlow preferred to write adult contemporary ballads while Martin-Smith pushed him into pursuing a heavier R&B direction for the album in an attempt to break the band into the US market. It would become Take That's last studio album to be recorded before they disbanded in 1996, and also the last album to feature Robbie Williams until his return to the band in 2010 for Progress. In the UK, the album debuted at number one, selling 163,399 copies in its first week. The album spawned three UK number-one singles: "Sure", "Back for Good", which went to number one in over 31 countries worldwide, and "Never Forget". "Every Guy" was also issued as a promotional single, and "Sunday to Saturday" was issued as a single in Japan instead of "Never Forget", where it reached number 9.

The single release of "Never Forget" in July 1995 marked the departure of Williams, who started a solo career the following year. The album reached number one in the UK, German, Dutch, Irish, Finnish, Belgian, Austrian, Italian and Swiss charts, and was also released in the US by Arista Records on 15 August 1995, albeit with a different track listing, switching out four album tracks for three singles from Everything Changes: "Pray", "Babe" and "Love Ain't Here Anymore". For the album's American release, its cover was replaced by a picture of the group that excluded Williams.

In support of the album, the band went on the Nobody Else Tour, playing 31 dates across countries such as the UK, Australia, Thailand, Singapore and Japan. Footage from the concert was released on video, entitled Nobody Else: The Movie. The album has been certified 2× Platinum in the UK. The track "All That Matters to Me" appears exclusively on the Japanese edition of the album.

Track listing

Personnel

 Steve Anderson – keyboards, bass, drums
 Gary Barlow – vocals, songwriter, producer, programmer
 Greg Bone – guitar
 Brothers in Rhythm – producer
 Chris Cameron – programmer
 Howard Donald – vocals, songwriter
 Mathew Donaldson – photographer
 Andy Duncan – percussion
 Steve McNichol – assistant engineer
 Richard Niles – strings, brass
 Tessa Niles – additional vocals
 Neil Oldfield – guitar
 Jason Orange – vocals
 Mark Owen – vocals, songwriter
 Phil Palmer – guitar
 Morgan Penn – art direction
 Chris Porter – producer
 Tom O'Sullivan – photographer
 Robert Walker – photographer
 Tim Weidner – programmer
 Robbie Williams – vocals, songwriter
 Paul Wright – engineer

Charts

Weekly charts

Year-end charts

Certifications and sales

References

Take That albums
1995 albums